"The One with Rachel's Date" is the fifth episode of Friends' eighth season. It first aired on NBC in the United States on October 25, 2001. During the episode, Phoebe (Lisa Kudrow) begins dating Tim, a sous-chef from Monica's (Courteney Cox) restaurant. When Phoebe decides to end the relationship, it coincides with Monica wanting to fire him, with both fighting over who is going to dump Tim first. In the subplot, Joey (Matt LeBlanc) introduces Rachel (Jennifer Aniston) to his Days of Our Lives co-star, Kash Ford, and they go out on a date, which bothers Ross (David Schwimmer). Meanwhile, Chandler (Matthew Perry) blocks the promotion of a coworker, Bob, who has mistakenly been calling him Toby for the last five years.

"The One with Rachel's Date" was directed by Gary Halvorson and co-written by Brian Buckner and Sebastian Jones.

Plot
Phoebe (Lisa Kudrow) visits Monica (Courteney Cox) at her kitchen at Alessandro's, where she meets Tim, Monica's sous-chef. Phoebe and Tim really like each other, and Monica sets them up on a date. Monica wants to fire Tim because he lit her pastry chef on fire and is a really slow worker, but Phoebe convinces her to give him another chance. One day later, Monica still wants to fire him, and Phoebe wants to dump him because he is too anxious. Initially agreeing not to dump and fire him on the same day, they then argue about who should dump or fire him that day. When Phoebe meets with Tim at Central Perk to dump him, he gets paged by Monica for a meeting at work. This then results in Phoebe storming into Monica's workplace, interrupting the meeting. Left with no other options, Phoebe dumps Tim and Monica fires him simultaneously. However, when Tim says that Monica is the best chef he knows, she gives him another chance.

Rachel (Jennifer Aniston) visits Joey (Matt LeBlanc) on the set of Days of Our Lives, where she meets Kash, another actor on the soap opera. She asks Joey to set them up on a date. Joey is at first pessimistic because of Rachel's pregnancy. Rachel convinces him and then struggles to persuade Ross, who is fearful about what impact the date would have on the baby. The date ends early when Rachel accidentally tells Kash that she is pregnant. Rachel is reassured by Ross after she bumps into him on the street. Having initially declined an offer to join Ross at Central Perk for a coffee, Rachel changes her mind, but then notices he is getting acquainted with Mona (Bonnie Somerville), whom he met at Monica and Chandler's wedding reception, and leaves, unseen.

Whilst picking up Chandler (Matthew Perry) from his office for dinner plans, Ross meets Bob (Chris Parnell), a co-worker of Chandler who has always called him Toby for the last five years. While putting this into perspective, Chandler accidentally reveals that his middle name is Muriel, and Ross and Rachel make fun of him. When Chandler's boss wants Chandler's opinion about adding Bob to his team, Chandler is negative about it. When Bob finds out it was Chandler who blocked his promotion, he vents his anger to Chandler, who he still thinks is called Toby. Chandler then attempts to reveal his true identity to Bob, but cannot go through with it when he realises that Bob will be even angrier at him for it. Bob finally finds Chandler's office and starts trashing it. When Bob asks Chandler for help, he happily joins in destroying his own office.

Production
"The One with Rachel's Date" was co-written by Brian Buckner and Sebastian Jones, their seventh writing credit for the series after joining the writing staff in the second season. It was directed by Gary Halvorson, his first directing credit for the season. The episode marked the return of Mona, played by Bonnie Somerville, who previously appeared in the eighth-season premiere, "The One after I Do" introducing herself as a co-worker at Monica's restaurant.

The episode is dedicated to the memory of Richard L. Cox Sr., Courteney Cox's father.

Cultural references
Chandler's line "You like the Purple Rain display", is a reference to the 1984 film Purple Rain, starring Prince. At the end of the episode, the piano introduction of "Closing Time" by Semisonic is used.

Reception
In its original airing, "The One With Rachel's Date" finished second in ratings for the week of October 22–28, 2001, with a Nielsen rating of 16.1, equivalent to approximately 16.2 million viewing households. It was the second highest-rated show on NBC that week, following ER, which aired the same night. The episode premiered in the United Kingdom on E4 on February 7, 2002, and was watched by 1.25 million viewers, making it the most watched program on the network for the week ending February 10, 2002.

References

External links

2001 American television episodes
Friends (season 8) episodes